A hostler or ostler  is a groom or stableman, who is employed in a stable to take care of horses, usually at an inn. In the twentieth century the word came to be used in railroad industry for a type of train driver.

Etymology
The word is spelled "hostler" in American English, but "ostler" in British English.  It traces to c. 1386, meaning "one who tends to horses at an inn"—and also, occasionally, "innkeeper"—is derived from Anglo-French hostiler (modern French ), itself from Medieval Latin  "the monk who entertains guests at a monastery", from hospitale "inn" (compare hospital, hospitaller, hospitality).  A similar word, hostelero (innkeeper, the one that took care of a hostal), exists in Spanish.

Modern uses
According to the Dictionary of Occupational Titles, an ostler in motor transportation is a type of truck driver who directs trucks or tractors at vehicle parking or docking areas to move, position, or park trucks or trailers. In the United States railroad industry a hostler is a train driver, a type of railroad engineer who moves locomotives in and out of service facilities.

References

External links

Horse-related professions and professionals
Horse management
Archaic English words and phrases
Rail transport operations
Transport occupations